Ernesto Grillo (1 October 1929 – 18 June 1998) was an Argentine footballer who played as a midfielder for Independiente and Boca Juniors in Argentina, as well as A.C. Milan in Italy. He also represented the Argentina national team. He is included in the Argentine Football Association Hall of Fame. He became a legend when playing for Argentina scored the goal against England which beat 3–1 in 1953.

Biography
After learning his trade in the youth teams of River Plate and Independiente Grillo started his professional playing career in 1949 with Independiente.

The highlight of Grillo's career came on 14 May 1953 in a match versus England, when he scored a legendary goal for Argentina. That was the second time England arrived to South America after the 1950 FIFA World Cup held in Brazil and the team had remained unbeaten until the match which played at River Plate. That goal instituted the 14 May as "Argentine Footballer's Day".

In 1955, Grillo was part of the national squad that won the South American Championship 1955. In 1957, he moved to Italy where he won the 1958–59 Serie A championship with A.C. Milan.

He returned to Argentina in 1960 to play for Boca Juniors, where he played 101 matches and scored 11 goals in all competitions and won three league titles in 1962, 1964 and 1965.

Grillo finished his career as an active player 1966 when he was 37. Four years later he began his career as coach of Boca Juniors' youth divisions. Some players coached by Grillo during their first years were Roberto Mouzo, Oscar Ruggeri, Enrique Vidallé, Hugo Perotti, Marcelo Trobbiani and Alberto Tarantini amongst others. Grillo worked there until 31 December 1986 when the club decided not to continue working with him. In 1997, he went into depression and finally died on 18 June 1998.

References

External links

 
 RedArgentina.com 
 Entry in the AFA Hall of Fame 
  

1929 births
1998 deaths
Footballers from Buenos Aires
Argentine footballers
Argentina international footballers
Club Atlético Independiente footballers
Boca Juniors footballers
A.C. Milan players
Argentine football managers
Boca Juniors managers
Argentine expatriate footballers
Expatriate footballers in Italy
Argentine Primera División players
Serie A players
Argentine expatriate sportspeople in Italy
Copa América-winning players
Association football midfielders